McClenahan House is a historic home located at Pittsboro, Chatham County, North Carolina.  It was built before 1830, and is a one-story, three bay, frame dwelling on a brick foundation with Greek Revival and Federal style design elements. The house began as a one-room house and is one of only four buildings in Pittsboro that dates from the settlement era.

It was listed on the National Register of Historic Places in 1982.  It is located in the Pittsboro Historic District.

References

Houses on the National Register of Historic Places in North Carolina
Federal architecture in North Carolina
Greek Revival houses in North Carolina
Houses completed in 1830
Houses in Chatham County, North Carolina
National Register of Historic Places in Chatham County, North Carolina
Pittsboro, North Carolina
1830 establishments in North Carolina
Individually listed contributing properties to historic districts on the National Register in North Carolina